A beekeeper is a person who keeps bees.

Beekeeper may also refer to:

Film and TV
 The Beekeeper (film), Theodoros Angelopoulos film

Music
 The Beekeepers, British group
 The Beekeeper, Tori Amos album

See also
 Beekeeping
 The Beekeeper's Apprentice, book